Jüri Kurul (15 March 1872 Tõstamaa Parish, Kreis Pernau – 5 July 1937 Tallinn) was an Estonian politician. He was a member of II Riigikogu. He was a member of the Riigikogu since 18 December 1924. He replaced Georg Jürgenson. On 29 May 1925, he was removed from his position and he was replaced by Aleksander Lensman.

References

1872 births
1937 deaths
People from Pärnu
People from Kreis Pernau
Workers' United Front politicians
Members of the Riigikogu, 1923–1926